The Wollaston disaster was a railway accident that occurred on October 8, 1878, in the Wollaston neighborhood of Quincy, Massachusetts. 19 people were killed and 170 were injured when an incorrectly placed switch caused the derailment of a excursion train returning from a sporting event. The conductor who placed the switch was convicted of manslaughter, however the conviction was overturned on appeal.

Silver Lake special
A special train had been prepared for spectators returning from the well-attended Reagan-Davis sculling race on Silver Lake in Plympton, Massachusetts.  The train was made up of two locomotives, a baggage car where the racing shells were stored, a compartment coach where race officials, journalists, and one of the principals of the race, Patrick Reagan, were seated, and twenty passenger cars. In total the special contained 1,600 to 1,800 passengers. The train was not running on a set schedule and as was the case with late-running special trains, a notice was sent to railroad employees giving the train the right-of-way after 4 pm. It did not depart Silver Lake until around 6:30 pm.

Newport freight train
At 6:30 pm, the regularly-scheduled Newport local freight train departed Boston. The train, which consisted of an engine and 15 freight cars, was short-staffed as one of the brakemen had gone home sick earlier that day. It was against the rules of the road for the train to go out, however the conductor, Charles H. Hartwell incorrectly assumed that the Silver Lake special had already reached Boston and he was not informed to the contrary. He was instructed to pick up five empty flat cars from the Wollaston Foundry siding. Upon reaching the foundry, two switches were opened and the train was divided to put the cars in the center.

Accident
Around 7:30 pm, the foundry car was moved across the inward track to the outward track and put in place. At this time, the excursion train approached on the inward track. The freight train's engineer was able to move his engine and all of the cars attached to it out of the way of the Silver Lake special, however there was not enough time between the crossing of the foundry car and the arrival of the Silver Lake special to close the switches. With both switches set wrong, the special should have stayed on the rails and stopped on the siding. However, one of the switches was out of line, causing the special to strike the end of the rail and derail.

Several of the excursion train's cars telescoped, the compartment car was smashed, and three or four cars mounted on top of each other. The two locomotives, baggage car, compartment car, and four passenger cars came off the track. The cylinder of the second locomotive entered the side of the compartment car, killing all but one of its occupants. A total of 17 passengers and two railroad employees died and 166 passengers and 4 railroad employees were injured.

Investigation and trial
The Massachusetts Railroad Commission's investigation into the accident found the engineer and conductor of the freight train to be "guilty of gross and criminal negligence" and called for the arrest of the conductor, Charles H. Hartwell. On October 11, 1878, Massachusetts Attorney General Charles R. Train asked the Massachusetts State Police to arrest Hartwell. Hartwell made a statement to police claiming that he had written orders from his superior to act in the manner he did when the accident occurred. The following day he was arranged on the charge of manslaughter and held on $10,000 bail.

A formal inquest was conducted by Judge Everett C. Bumpus. Hartwell's attorney blamed the accident on the Newport train's headlight, which prevented the engineer of the excursion train from seeing the switch and danger signals until it was only a few hundred feet away. The defense counsel contended that had the engineer seen the red switch lights and the signal lantern, the accident would have been prevented. Bumpus found Hartwell was guilty of gross negligence for running short-staffed and not notifying his managers, allowed his train to stand on the outward track unsignalled, and directed his engine to occupy the inward track, and caused the switches to be changed and remained unlocked without leaving the inward track signalled. He also found the engineer of the freight train, Charles H. Hurlburt, to be negligent for occupying the inward track without a signal. As for the excursion train, he concluded that Charles Westgate should not have been engineer of the lead locomotive due to his inexperience with the road. Lastly he criticized the lack of communication, stating that if either the freight train or excursion train had been notified of the other's presence, the accident would have been avoided.

Hartwell's trial began on April 22, 1879. On April 24 the jury found him guilty after one hour of deliberation. According to the New York Times, the jurors "would have liked to return a different verdict, but it was impossible" based on the instructions given by the Judge. The Times also noted that "the public sympathy for Hartwell appears to be very general and the feeling that he is made a scapegoat is wide-spread".

On February 27, 1880, the Massachusetts Supreme Judicial Court overturned the verdict, holding that the lower court had erred by not requiring the prosecution to prove that Hartwell knew that the arrival of the excursion train was imminent and that there was no evidence to prove this allegation.

References

1878 in Massachusetts
Accidents and incidents involving Old Colony Railroad
October 1878 events
Quincy, Massachusetts
Railway accidents in 1878
Railway accidents and incidents in Massachusetts
1878 disasters in the United States